Fenton is a city in the U.S. state of Michigan that lies mostly in Genesee County, with small portions in neighboring Oakland County and Livingston County. It is part of the Flint Metropolitan statistical area.

History

It was first established in 1834 and was originally named "Dibbleville" after Clark Dibble, one of the first settlers. It was platted in 1837 as "Fentonville" by William M. Fenton who would later become lieutenant-governor of Michigan. When the settlement was incorporated as a village in 1863 the name Fenton was used.
The settlement's post office used the name Fentonville from 1837 until 1886, when it adopted the current name.

In the 1970s, the city leveled its downtown buildings and closed Leroy Street as part of an urban renewal plan. On August 24, 2007, an EF2 tornado hit Fenton, damaging several homes and a school, and almost completely destroying the soon to be opened Tractor Supply Company, tearing off its roof. This caused many people to go without power, leaving the city in a state of emergency. There were no fatalities or serious injuries. In July 2011, the first proposed building, Cornerstone, to restore the city's old downtown area was announced.

As of the 2010 census, the city population was 11,756. The city was incorporated from Fenton Township in Genesee County, and the city and township are administratively autonomous. Fenton includes several historic buildings. It was home to the first aviation school in Michigan and the A.J. Phillips Fenton Museum.

Geography

Numerous municipalities in Michigan span two counties, but Fenton is one of two municipalities in the state of Michigan to span three counties; the other being the capital city of Lansing. The Genesee County portion represents 98.29% of Fenton's total area and 99.99% of its population. Of Fenton's 11,747 residents, all but 10 residents live in Genesee County.

The Tipsico Lake Project is a brownfield redevelopment project to restore the land and surrounding area.

Demographics

2020 census 
As of the census of 2020, there were 12,050 people, 5,025 households, and 3,060 families living in the city. The racial makeup of the city was 93% White, 1.6% African American, 0.5% Asian, and 4.7% from two or more races. Hispanic or Latino of any race were 5.1% of the population.

There were 5,025 households, of which 27.5% had children under the age of 18 living with them, 45.9% were married couples living together, 9.2% had a female householder with no husband present, 5.8% had a male householder with no wife present, and 39.1% were non-families. 34.5% of all households were made up of individuals, and 15.2% had someone living alone who was 65 years of age or older. The average household size was 2.34, and the average family size was 3.00.

The median age of the city was 38.2 years. 23.2% of residents were under the age of 18; 6.5% were between the ages of 18 and 24; 31.5% were from 25 to 44; 22.3% were from 45 to 64, and 16.4% were 65 years of age or older. The gender makeup of the city was 44.4% male and 55.6% female.

2010 census
As of the census of 2010, there were 11,756 people, 5,067 households, and 2,953 families living in the city. The racial makeup of the city was 95.1% White, 1.3% African American, 0.3% Native American, 0.7% Asian, 0.5% from other races, and 2.0% from two or more races. Hispanic or Latino of any race were 2.5% of the population.

There were 5,067 households, of which 31.9% had children under the age of 18 living with them, 39.8% were married couples living together, 13.2% had a female householder with no husband present, 5.2% had a male householder with no wife present, and 41.7% were non-families. 34.9% of all households were made up of individuals, and 13.5% had someone living alone who was 65 years of age or older. The average household size was 2.27 and the average family size was 2.96.

The median age in the city was 36 years. 24.1% of residents were under the age of 18; 8.9% were between the ages of 18 and 24; 29.7% were from 25 to 44; 22.8% were from 45 to 64, and 14.4% were 65 years of age or older. The gender makeup of the city was 46.8% male and 53.2% female.

2000 census
As of the census of 2000, there were 10,582 people, 4,335 households, and 2,709 families living in the city. The racial makeup of the city was 96.25% White, 0.60% African American, 0.39% Native American, 0.95% Asian, 0.66% from other races, and 1.16% from two or more races. Hispanic or Latino of any race were 1.80% of the population.

There were 4,335 households, out of which 32.9% had children under the age of 18 living with them, 48.5% were married couples living together, 10.8% had a female householder with no husband present, and 37.5% were non-families. 30.7% of all households were made up of individuals, and 11.2% had someone living alone who was 65 years of age or older. The average household size was 2.38 and the average family size was 3.01.

In the city, the population was spread out, with 25.4% under the age of 18, 8.5% from 18 to 24, 33.7% from 25 to 44, 18.8% from 45 to 64, and 13.6% who were 65 years of age or older. The median age was 34 years. For every 100 females, there were 88.5 males. For every 100 females age 18 and over, there were 85.6 males.

The median income for a household in the city was $47,400, and the median income for a family was $55,637. Males had a median income of $44,874 versus $30,435 for females. The per capita income for the city was $22,435. About 4.4% of families and 6.2% of the population were below the poverty line, including 5.9% of those under age 18 and 12.4% of those age 65 or over.

Infrastructure

Highways
US Highway 23 runs north and south through the west side of the city as a freeway. The original routing of US 23 ran northeasterly along Shiawassee Avenue to Leroy Street, then northerly along Leroy to the northern edge of the city. The portion of old US  23 south of Silver Lake Road, along with Silver Lake Road itself westerly back to US  23, was designated a business route of US 23 in 1958, before being removed as a state trunkline in 2006.

Utilities
The municipality operates its own water system.

Notable people
 Cynthia Roberts Gorton (1826–1894), blind poet and author
 Ira W. Jayne (1882–1961), Wayne County Circuit Court Chief Judge
Ava Michelle (born 2002), American actress best known for her role as Jodi in Tall Girl

References

Notes

Sources

External links

City of Fenton official website

Cities in Genesee County, Michigan
Cities in Livingston County, Michigan
Cities in Oakland County, Michigan
Metro Detroit
Populated places established in 1834
1834 establishments in Michigan Territory